Dipankar Vidyapith is an Assamese medium private school in Jorhat, India. It is located near Malow Ali in the heart of the city. There are 30 staff and more than 600 students. The languages of instruction are Assamese and English. Students of Dipankar Vidyapith appear for High School Leaving Certificate (class 10 exam) under the Board of Secondary Education, Assam.

The school was established by a lady called Suruchi Devi, in the name of her grandson Dipankar who died at an early age. She donated her land and formed a trust named Dipankar Vidyapith Trust Committee to establish the school. Since then Dipankar Vidyapith is run by Dipankar Vidyapith Trust Committee. At present the president of the trust is Dr. Paresh Chandra Bora. Mrs. Kiran Phukan was the first headmistress of the school. The school started classes in 1990 with just 50 students in the first year. Mrs. Bina Baruah and Mrs. Rekha Bezbaruah joined the school next.

Mr. Parthasarathi Baruah is the present principal of the school. The school celebrated  silver jubilee in the year 2015 

State Rank holders from Dipankar Vidyapith in High School Leaving Certificate Examination

Arjyama Bordoloi    9th Rank in 2014
Dipjyoti Dutta     11th Rankin 2016

References

Private schools in Assam
Jorhat
Education in Jorhat district
1990 establishments in Assam
Educational institutions established in 1990